Cool School Camp is a 2008 Turkish comedy film, directed by Faruk Aksoy, about a class of teenage students who take revenge on a rival who attempts to sabotage their unconventional school.

Plot
A villainous rival sends in four double agents to sabotage the exam preparations of the student body of Hadi Hodja's private education institute in a holiday village in Antalya. But when the students uncover the plot they take revenge.

Cast
 Alp Kırşan as Bekir the Clumsy
 Okan Karacan as Dr. Bilgin
 Paşhan Yılmazel as Mojo
 Berksan as Berksan
 Simge Tertemiz as Ms. Leg
 Duygu Çetinkaya as Kurdela
 Sevil Uyar
 Ceyda Ateş
 Ozan Aydemir as Hasan the Trickster
 Mustafa Topaloğlu
 Cüneyt Arkın
 Sibel Tüzün

Release

Reception
The movie reached number one at the Turkish box office and was one of the highest grossing Turkish films of 2008 with a total gross of US$5,284,100.

References

External links

2008 films
2000s teen comedy films
Films set in Turkey
Turkish teen comedy films
Turkish sequel films
2008 comedy films